In mathematics, the continuum function is , i.e. raising 2 to the power of κ using cardinal exponentiation.  Given a cardinal number, it is the cardinality of the power set of a set of the given cardinality.

See also
Continuum hypothesis
Cardinality of the continuum
Beth number
Easton's theorem
Gimel function

Cardinal numbers